The Takahashi method is a technique deploying extremely simple and distilled visual slides for presentations. It is similar to the Lessig method, created by Harvard professor and former presidential candidate Lawrence Lessig.

It is named for its inventor, Masayoshi Takahashi. Unlike a typical presentation, no pictures and no charts are used. Only a few words are printed on each slide—often only one or two short words, using very large characters. To make up for this, a presenter will use many more slides than in a traditional presentation, each slide being shown for a much shorter duration.

Further information
Once Takahashi, a programmer, had to give a short presentation at a conference (RubyConf) so he first used the method and found it helpful, at least with Japanese. Takahashi never used PowerPoint or similar software, he uses only text in his slides. He started thinking about how to use the best word for each slide as he took the audience through his presentation. The words or phrases resemble Japanese newspaper headlines rather than sentences which must be read.

The slides use plain text in a visual manner, to help the audience quickly read and understand the material. It's said to be helpful with Japanese and other eastern languages which use non-Latin alphabets.

Many presenters in developer conferences use their own variant on Takahashi. Notably, Audrey Tang's stock presentations at Perl and Open Source conferences use this method.

External links
 Living large: "Takahashi Method" uses king-sized text as a visual
 Big – small Javascript tool for making Takahashi-style presentations on the web
 Weenote – minimal Javascript tool for making Takahashi-style presentations on the web
 takahashi.sty – package for making Takahashi-style presentation in Beamer (LaTeX)
 Slide – open-source Android application for making Takahashi-style presentations
 sent – open-source tool for Takahashi method, developed for Unix, and Unix-like operating systems by suckless.org.

Presentation